Line 8 of the Changchun Rail Transit is a light metro line running from south to north in northern Changchun. It opened on 30 October 2018. This line is 13.3 km long with 12 stations.

Opening timeline

Service routes
  —

Stations

References

Changchun Rail Transit lines
Railway lines opened in 2018
2018 establishments in China